The Armenian Pantheon of Tbilisi, also known as Khojivank ( Khojivank'i) or Khojavank, is an Armenian architectural complex in north-eastern part of Avlabari district of Tbilisi, Georgia. Many notable Armenian writers, artists and public figures are buried there.

It formerly consisted of a huge memorial cemetery and the Holy Mother of God Armenian Church (St. Astvatsatsin church). The church and most part of the cemetery was destroyed in 1937, and most of the remaining part of the cemetery was destroyed between 1995 and 2004 during the construction of the Holy Trinity Cathedral of Tbilisi Cathedral (also known as Sameba Cathedral). The tiny part that remains, together with some relocated gravestones, is preserved as the Armenian Pantheon of Tbilisi.

Construction and rise 
The area was given to Armenian Bebut-Bek of Bebutov family in 1612 by Shah Abbas by appropriate diploma. His son Aslan Meliq-Bebut, treasurer of Georgian king Rostom of Kartli enlarged the original cemetery, built pipes for bringing water here, planted a number of trees and in 1655 built St. Astvatsatin church, called Khojivank as a name of the founded, who was called by Georgian king Rostom – Khoja Bebut (Big Bebut). Later the cemetery was called Khojivank too. The building sign preserved and is kept in Historical-Ethnographic Museum of Tbilisi, which says: "In summer of Armenian year of 1104 with the wish of God I, Khoja Bebut and my brother Khatin and my wife Lali built this church of humble Aslan". St. Astvatsatsin church was dedicated to Saint Purple Mother of God, was circled in fence, had beautiful walls and had a blossoming garden beside. Later the diploma of Bebutovs was renewed by Teimuraz II and Erekle II.

In 1899 a massive boundary wall was built around the cemetery, which by that time had enlarged immensely to become the largest Armenian cemetery in Tbilisi. The number of graves in the period before its destruction reached more than 90,000.

Destruction of the cemetery 

By the 1920s burials in Khojivank had almost ceased.

In 1934, on Lavrentiy Beria's order, the church and cemetery started to be destroyed. The St. Astvatsatin church with surrounding church buildings were destroyed, all the chapels and crypts were crushed together with most of graves, whose gravestones and khachkars of rare marble and other stones were reused as building materials in other structures. The Marxism-Leninism Institute building used a great deal of marble from the destruction of Khojivank, as did the Baratashvili ascent, the walkway in front of the Pioneer's Palace, the Institute of the Party halls (the current Georgian parliament) and Lavrentiy Beria's house at 11 Machabeli. The wall bordering School #68 and a water tower built in 1961 was also built of those gravestones. Some stones were used in a stairway in a park on Madaten island, and many other buildings. Special brigades of the People's Commissariat for State Security were seeking for precious items around the cemetery. This continued until 1938, by which time most of the cemetery had been destroyed, and a little part of the graves were saved and generally were moved to Petropavlovskoe cemetery. The gravestones of Hovhannes Tumanyan and Raffi were saved. The area was rebuilt as a park with the preliminary name "26 Commissars Park of Culture and Leisure", but its final name was "Friendship Park", where the walls were built mainly of Armenian gravestones.

On 17 March 1962 the Armenian Pantheon was opened containing about 30 saved gravestones – most of which did not have any human remains beneath them.

In 1994 construction of Holy Trinity Cathedral started inside the park area. At first it was announced to occupy area beside Khojivank, but the size of the new church was huge and it covered a significant part of Khojivank, including the site of the St. Astvatsatsin Armenian Church. During foundation work for the church, bulldozers and excavators dug up the remains of thousands of those who had been interred in the cemetery, and around the future church mounds of skulls and bones were formed. These human remains, mixed with broken tombstones and other debris, were later taken away in trucks to an unknown destination. Most of the remaining graves were removed, most gravestones were removed. Grigoriy Dolukhanov's gravestone was thrown in front of the Armenian theater and left for several years. As a response to Armenian protests the construction temporarily stopped. In June 1997 construction started again.

On 25 December 2002 the first church service was held. On November 23, 2004 the Holy Trinity Cathedral of Tbilisi was officially opened.

Epigrams 
The graves in the cemetery had a great number of epigrams and gravestones with short notes, which revealed much about the Armenian population of Tbilisi, families, various heritages and different sides of social life. Among the more famous epigrams were Sayat-Nova's wife's gravestone epigram, which said "456 (1768 y.). In this grave I am – wife of Sayat-Nova Marmar. Bless". Another example was epigram: "Here I am – wife of Ter-David, Archpriest of Mughni church. Who reads remember. Summer 420 (1732y.)". Grigor Artsruni's gravestone, created like a cliff, is lost. Ghazaros Aghayan gravestone with the epigram: "Friend of children Ghazaros Aghayan" is lost too. Some epigrams are preserved thanks to A. Yeremyan, who rewrote and published in Vienna the epigraphs of Khojivank of 19th century end – 20th century start, and some single examples are preserved in the Historical-Ethnographic museum in Tbilisi. Yeremyan wrote, "there were thousands of granite, marble sculptures and stelea, thousands of short and exciting notes, sad poems and quatrains".

Burials 
Here are some of the famous Armenians burials:

Among famous Armenian families buried in Khojivank were
 Bebutov family
 Karaganov family
 Sarajev family
 Kalantarov family
 Kuzanov family
 Amirov family
 Sharoev family
 Agajanov family
 Ter-Davidov family
 Beriev family
 Muradov family
 Ter-Ghevondyan family
 Amiragov family
 Pitoev family
 Tarkhanov family
 Tumanov family
 Argutinsky-Dolgoroukov family (destroyed)

Gallery

See also 
 Komitas Pantheon, similar cemetery in Yerevan, Armenia for burials of great Armenians
 Armenians in Georgia
 Armenians in Tbilisi
 Holy Trinity Cathedral of Tbilisi
 List of cemeteries in Georgia (country)

References 

  Հայկական հանրագիտարան – Թբիլիսիի Խոջիվանքի պանթեոն (Haykakan hanragitaran – T'bilisii Khojivanki pant'eon)
  Հավլաբար. Թբիլիսիի հայկական համայնքը վճարում է ուրբանիզացիայի գինը (Havlabar. T'bilisii haykakan hamaynkë vcharum ē vurbanizats'iayi ginë)

External links

 

Armenian cemeteries
Cemeteries in Georgia (country)
Monuments and memorials in Tbilisi
Armenian diaspora in Georgia (country)